is the first Japan-exclusive action video game based on the Peanuts cartoon characters Snoopy licensed from Peanuts and United Feature Syndicate (now a part of United Media), which was released for the Super Famicom in 1995.  Some English-patched ROM images has been released on the internet.

Summary

Gameplay

The game is a less of a self-contained game and more of a collection of four smaller ones, including a point-and-click segment featuring Schroeder. The player controls Woodstock and directs Snoopy as he performs all sorts of errands for different Peanuts characters. The player does a separate game for each character; some of them require him to do a little detective work, to direct Snoopy to win a race, or to get a character to some place. The ultimate goal in the game is to get everyone in shape for Snoopy's concert. Games can either be played using stereo or monoaural sound.

The music was composed by Hirokazu Tanaka and Minako Hamano, in addition to arrangements of the familiar works of Vince Guaraldi.

Characters
 Rerun
 Linus
 Schroeder
 Peppermint Patty
 Charlie Brown
 Snoopy
 Woodstock

Reception
On release, Famicom Tsūshin scored the game a 28 out of 40.

See also
 Super NES Mouse
 List of Peanuts media

References

1995 video games
Japan-exclusive video games
Nintendo Integrated Research and Development games
Pax Softnica games
Video games based on Peanuts
Super Nintendo Entertainment System games
Super Nintendo Entertainment System-only games
Video games developed in Japan
Video games scored by Hirokazu Tanaka
Mitsui Fudosan
Action video games
Single-player video games
Video games about dogs